Güzelhisar is a neighborhood of the District of Akyurt, Ankara Province, Turkey.

References

Populated places in Ankara Province
Akyurt
Neighbourhoods of Akyurt